The Liga Superior de Baloncesto (LSB) (English: Superior Basketball League) is the highest level men's professional basketball league in Cuba. The LSB has been active for twenty-eight years, interrupted only three times, once in 2011, 2014, and in 2020. 

Ciego de Ávila is the most decorated team of the league with 10 championships.

Current teams
Artemisa
Capitalinos Azules de La Habana
Guantánamo CB
Guerreros de Matanzas
Sancti Spiritus
Santiago de Cuba
Tigres de Camaguey
Villa Clara

Former Teams
Ciego de Ávila
Cienfuegos
Holguin
Las Tunas
Occidentales
Orientales
Pinar del Rio
Sancti Spiritus

Post Season Structure
During the regular season, 60-160 games are played within the two months of league activity. The top four teams with the most wins are entered into the post season semifinals. The two respective winners from the semifinals advance to the finals, and whoever wins in the finals is crowned the champion. The semifinals and finals are played to best of five, with no draws allowed.

Standings 2001-2019

Champions

External links
LatinBasket.com League Page

Basketball competitions in Cuba
Cuba
Professional sports leagues in Cuba